The  or  (Dutch), is a long north–south arterial road from Brussels to Waterloo, Belgium. It begins at the Halle Gate in the Brussels municipality of Saint-Gilles, continues a course towards the south-east until the Bascule area of Uccle, then turns south in the direction of Waterloo, where it changes its name to become the Chaussée de Bruxelles and continues in the direction of Genappe and Charleroi (Wallonia) until the regional border.

Historically, the Chaussée de Waterloo was the main road from Brussels to Charleroi, crossing the Sonian Forest, and it remains one of the region's main arteries. The road crosses several districts, working class at its starting point in Saint-Gilles, but adorned with chic boutiques and restaurants as it progresses towards Waterloo, in particular in the Fort Jaco district in Uccle and in Waterloo itself. It is also home to many neoclassical, Art Nouveau and Art Deco town houses, and other historical buildings. It is served by TEC and De Lijn bus lines numbers 136, 137, and 365, which have replaced the local tram.

History
The Chaussée de Waterloo appeared in 1662. Originally, it was simply an extension of the old / from the place called La Bascule to Waterloo. The road, which was also called the / was again extended at the end of the 17th century to Charleroi and Namur. In 1711, under the Austrian rule, it was decided to divert the new road at La Bascule and to extend it to the Halle Gate in Saint-Gilles. The construction was carried out between 1725 and 1727. The first section, connecting the Halle Gate to the / (literally "Barrier of Saint Gilles", named after tollgate which stood there), follows the slight curves of the old  (Middle Dutch for "Way towards Uccle"). The second section, for its part, constitutes a new straight artery linking the Barrière to Ixelles.

Since the end of the 19th century, the Chaussée de Waterloo has been one of the main commercial arteries to and from Brussels and has therefore played a crucial role in the development of the districts it crosses. The straight part of the street was developed from the mid-1870s. From 1890, the constructions rose at an increasingly rapid rate, so by the 1910s, the road was almost entirely built.

Until the beginning of the 20th century, the Chaussée de Waterloo included a bridge, at the level of Ma Campagne in Saint-Gilles, which spanned a sunken road leading to Saint-Job (today's /). During the construction of the Berkendael district, which began around 1875, the irregular relief of the land was levelled, making the bridge superfluous. Consequently, the old  way also disappeared, although its name persists in the present /.

From the beginning of the 20th century, the road was a prosperous place of commerce. The creation of the link between Brussels-South railway station and Uccle, first by horse-drawn tramway (1871–1879) then, from 1896, by an electric tram line, undoubtedly contributed to this development. The last major building campaigns took place during the 1930s. In the evening of 3 September 1944, tanks of the British Guards Armoured Division appeared after a forced advance on the Chaussée de Waterloo. They met hardly any resistance and liberated Brussels that same day.

Nowadays, the Chaussée de Waterloo is used daily by many commuters living outside Brussels who come to work in the Belgian capital. It is thus one of the region's main arteries, and helps to smooth traffic at its southern end. Houses intended solely for housing are rare; most of them also fulfil a commercial function. In order to adapt to fashions, store fronts underwent many transformations. Apart from commercial activities, the street is also lined with of a few industries, as well as offices.

Description
In the territory of Ixelles (from no. 363  to no. 685  and from no. 410  to no. 732), the Chaussée de Waterloo is straight between the crossroads it forms with the Chaussée de Charleroi/Charleroisesteenweg, at Ma Campagne (Saint-Gilles), and those formed by the Chaussée de Vleurgat, the / and the / (near Uccle). It divides the Ixelles enclave into two distinct parts. On the one hand, to the north-east, the Tenbosch district (1864) that the Chaussée de Charleroi and the Avenue Louise/Louizalaan delimit. On the other, to the south-west, the Berkendael district (1902), a triangular territory delimited by the Avenue Brugmann and the Avenue Molière. The mixed character that characterises the entire roadway is no exception there.

On the Brussels section, there are many historical terraced houses, and old country houses, such as no. 928, in Art Deco style, by the architect Édouard Antoine, and no. 916, sharply set back from the alignment. Several houses belong to neoclassicism: no. 920 (1893), modified in 1911–12, and no. 922, under a hipped roof and retaining a beautiful old door with an open transom lined with glazing bars, dating from the third quarter of the 19th century. Regarding shops and restaurants, at no. 964, straddling Brussels and Uccle and at the current location of the service station, there was, at the beginning of the 20th century, the café-restaurant-boarding house Le Vert Chasseur, to be related to the development of the Bois de la Cambre/Ter Kamerenbos. No. 892–915, currently a motorcycle shop, was originally a boat showroom. These two hangars were built in 1961 and 1970 and equipped with a basin to present the models.

See also

 List of streets in Brussels
 Neoclassical architecture in Belgium
 Art Nouveau in Brussels
 Art Deco in Brussels
 History of Brussels
 Belgium in "the long nineteenth century"

References

Notes

Bibliography
 Crockaert, Henri, Évolution territoriale d'Uccle. Esquisse historique, folklorique et archéologique (in French), Administration communale d'Uccle, Brussels, 1958, p. 35–38
 Moutury, Sarah, Cordeiro, Paula, Heymans, Vincent, Les quartiers Franklin Roosevelt et Vert Chasseur (in French), Cellule du Patrimoine historique, Ville de Bruxelles, Brussels, 1998, s.p.
 Wauters, Alphonse, Histoire des environs de Bruxelles, ou description historique des localités qui formaient autrefois l'ammanie de cette ville [1855] (in French), tenth book, t. I, éd. Culture et Civilisation, Brussels, 1973. p. 233
 Ixelles, Ensembles urbanistiques et architecturaux remarquables (in French), ERU asbl, Brussels, 1990, p. 35–40

Streets in Brussels
Ixelles
Saint-Gilles, Belgium
Uccle
City of Brussels
Waterloo, Belgium